Garry William Dowling (7 November 1952 – 5 March 1983) was an Australian professional rugby league footballer who played in the 1970s and 1980s.

Playing career
He played eight seasons of club football and 113 first grade games for Canterbury-Bankstown between 1971-1978, two seasons at Parramatta between 1979-1980, and one season at Western Suburbs in 1981. 

A talented fullback, Dowling represented New South Wales in 1975 and 1980 and for the Australian national side in two tests against New Zealand, also in 1980 of which he was named 'Player of the Series'. He is listed on the Australian Players Register as Kangaroo No.525.

Death
Garry Dowling died in a car accident near Mount Tamborine on 5 March 1983.

References

External links
Profile at Bulldogs League Club Website

1952 births
1983 deaths
Australia national rugby league team players
Australian rugby league players
New South Wales Rugby League State of Origin players
Canterbury-Bankstown Bulldogs players
Parramatta Eels players
Rugby league fullbacks
Road incident deaths in Queensland
Rugby league players from Sydney
Western Suburbs Magpies players